Züssow is a railway station in the town of Züssow, Mecklenburg-Vorpommern, Germany. The station lies on the Angermünde–Stralsund railway and the Züssow–Wolgast Hafen railway and the train services are operated by Deutsche Bahn and Usedomer Bäderbahn. This station is where the junction to services onto the island of Usedom is.

Train services
The station is served by the following service(s):

Intercity-Express services (ICE 28) (Binz -) Stralsund - Eberswalde - Berlin - Leipzig - Jena - Nuremberg - Munich (- Innsbruck)
Intercity services (IC 32) Binz - Stralsund - Eberswalde - Berlin - Hanover - Dortmund - Essen - Duisburg - Düsseldorf - Cologne
Regional services  Stralsund - Greifswald - Pasewalk - Angermünde - Berlin - Ludwigsfelde - Jüterbog - Falkenberg - Elsterwerda
Local services  Züssow - Wolgast - Heringsdorf - Świnoujście
Local services  Züssow - Greifswald - Stralsund

References

Railway stations in Mecklenburg-Western Pomerania
Railway stations in Germany opened in 1863
Buildings and structures in Vorpommern-Greifswald